Hakim Saci (born 3 May 1977 in Saint-Denis, France) is a former professional footballer who played as a striker. He played for En Avant de Guingamp and FC Metz in Ligue 1. He began his professional career at Red Star 93, a club in France. He also played for Grenoble, AS Cannes, Umm Salal, US Boulogne and UJA Alfortville. Born in France, he represented Algeria at international level.

Career statistics

References

External links

1977 births
Living people
Association football forwards
Algerian footballers
French footballers
Algeria international footballers
French sportspeople of Algerian descent
Ligue 1 players
Ligue 2 players
Qatar Stars League players
Red Star F.C. players
En Avant Guingamp players
FC Metz players
Grenoble Foot 38 players
AS Cannes players
US Boulogne players
Umm Salal SC players
UJA Maccabi Paris Métropole players
Algerian expatriates in Qatar
French expatriate footballers
French expatriate sportspeople in Qatar
Algerian expatriate sportspeople in Qatar
Expatriate footballers in Qatar
Sportspeople from Saint-Denis, Seine-Saint-Denis
Footballers from Seine-Saint-Denis